Hetaira is a genus of Central and South American bush crickets in the subfamily Phaneropterinae.

References

Phaneropterinae
Tettigoniidae genera